The Newcastle-under-Lyme by-election of 30 October 1969 was caused by the death of Labour MP Stephen Swingler in February of that year. It was held on the same day as four other by-elections (in Glasgow Gorbals, Islington North, Paddington North, and Swindon) and the seat was retained by Labour.

Results

Aftermath
Although the Conservatives achieved a 10.7% swing from Labour, John Golding claimed that his victory was a vote of confidence in Harold Wilson's Government. Conservative supporters responded by shouting "Rubbish", while their unsuccessful candidate, Nicholas Winterton, stated the result was notice for the Government "to quit - and soon". The other three by-elections in England held on the same day also saw similar large swings to the Conservatives, with Swindon being gained by the latter party.

References

Newcastle-under-Lyme by-election
Newcastle-under-Lyme by-election
By-elections to the Parliament of the United Kingdom in Staffordshire constituencies
Politics of the Borough of Newcastle-under-Lyme
20th century in Staffordshire
Newcastle-under-Lyme by-election